The Sony Xperia XA2 is an Android smartphone manufactured and marketed by Sony. Part of the Xperia X series, the device was announced to the public along with the Xperia XA2 Ultra and Xperia L2 at the annual 2018 Consumer Electronics Show on January 8, 2018. This was the last Sony phone to have the Sony logo above the screen on the front of the Phone.

Specifications

Hardware 
The device features a  1080p screen.

The rear-facing camera of the Xperia XA2 is 23 megapixels. The front facing camera is 8 MP.

Software 
The Xperia XA2 is preinstalled with Android 8.0 Oreo with Sony's custom interface and software. It is upgradable to Android 9 Pie.

References

External links 

Android (operating system) devices
Sony smartphones